Leroy Francis D'Sa (born 12 October 1953) is a retired Indian badminton player. D'sa is one of the first finest doubles player country has ever produced, and he dominated the Indian doubles internationally until late 80s.

D'sa is the only player from India ever to have managed to claim four Asian games medals, until now as of 2018 games, his record remains intact. He initially learned the basics of the sport in Hyderabad where his father was posted in Reserve Bank of India. Further he moved to Kanpur then Mumbai to develop his game even more. In Mumbai he was employed by the Railway in 1974. Indian contingent went on to win silver at the 1983 Asian championships in Calcutta. D'sa was part of that team. The same year he won Austrian International in men's doubles with Partho Ganguly. Again at the Asian games in 1986, he bagged men's team medal. 

He was one of the only players to have medalled from India at the individual events in Asian games until for next 36 years. In 1982, D'sa claimed two bronze medals in men's and mixed doubles with Pradeep Gandhe and Kanwal Thakar Singh in a scratch pairing. Usually D'sa played men' doubles with Sanat Mishra in international circuit. He has 7 national championship titles to his name with different partners, Prakash Padukone, Ami Ghia, Sanat Mishra and Suresh Goel. D'sa was coaching the Pullela Gopichand when he won the 2001 All England title. He played at the state level until his late 50s and has shaped next generation of Indian doubles which includes players like Jwala Gutta, V. Diju, Sanave Thomas and many others. Currently he is training new crop of players in Hindu Gymkhana in Mumbai.

Achievements

Asian Games 
Men's doubles

Mixed doubles

IBF International 
Men's doubles

References

External links
 

1953 births
Living people
Indian male badminton players
Indian national badminton champions
Racket sportspeople from Mumbai
Asian Games medalists in badminton
Badminton players at the 1978 Asian Games
Badminton players at the 1982 Asian Games
Badminton players at the 1986 Asian Games
Asian Games bronze medalists for India
Medalists at the 1982 Asian Games
Medalists at the 1986 Asian Games
Commonwealth Games competitors for India
Badminton players at the 1982 Commonwealth Games